Macquarie Park railway station is located on the Sydney Metro Northwest line, serving the Sydney suburb of Macquarie Park. It was formerly part of Sydney Trains' T1 Northern Line and then from 26 May 2019, Metro North West Line services.

History
Macquarie Park station opened as part of the Epping to Chatswood Rail Link on 23 February 2009.

Macquarie Park station closed in September 2018 for seven months for conversion to a Sydney Metro station on the Sydney Metro Northwest line, which included the installation of platform screen doors. It reopened on 26 May 2019.

Services

There are currently 12 bus routes servicing Macquarie Park station operated by Busways, Forest Coach Lines, Hillsbus and Transit Systems, and one NightRide route.

References

External links

Macquarie Park station details Transport for New South Wales

Easy Access railway stations in Sydney
Railway stations in Australia opened in 2009
Sydney Metro stations
Macquarie Park, New South Wales
City of Ryde